The Oman Professional League (known as the Omantel Professional League for sponsorship reasons), previously known as the Omantel Elite League, is the top division of the Oman Football Association, and was officially created in 1976. Currently the most successful team in the league is Dhofar with a total of eleven titles to their name.

Evolution to a professional league
In 2010, during the annual draw for the Sultan Qaboos Cup, Sultan Qaboos bin Said, Sultan of Oman, granted the OFA an annual 2.6 million rial (approximately 6.7 million dollars) till the year 2015 to further boost the development of the league. The move was made to nurture Oman's football youth, and create higher hopes of Oman qualifying for the 2014 FIFA World Cup. The deal is in addition to the annual 1.6 million rial that the Sultan gives to the OFA every year.

Although being very popular in the local community, it was ranked according to the AFC as a Class D football League till the 2012–13 season. Sayyid Khalid bin Hamid Al-Busaidi, OFA President, had already announced his organization's plan to transform the Omani Football League into a professional league by 2012, and also announced to change the league's name to the Oman Mobile League. The interest from many companies such as Nissan, Shell and Oman Mobile, was one of the main reasons why the league was expected to transform, under with the leadership of Sayyid Khalid.

The contract was extended again for the 2011–12 season for another three years to be known as the Omantel Elite League.

In 2013, ahead of the 2013–14 season, it was announced that the league had taken the first steps to becoming fully professional.  The Oman Football League got the seal of approval as a professional league on 1 September 2013 and will henceforth be called the Omantel Professional League (OPL).

On 10 September 2014, one day before the first match of the 2014–15 season was played, Oman Football Association announced the extension of Omantel’s support for the country’s Professional League as its title sponsor.

On 30 April 2016, OFA and the Public Authority for Radio and Television (PART) reached an agreement on TV broadcasting rights of all competitions and matches organised by OFA including those related to OPL and any other competitions and matches for three seasons.

On 5 September 2016, the leading healthcare services provider in the Sultanate, Badr Al Samaa Group of Hospitals renewed their partnership with OFA for the 2016-17 Omani football season. On 8 September 2016, OFA confirmed that Omantel will be renewing their contract as the title sponsors of the OPL for the following three years, starting with the 2016-17 season until the 2018-19 season.

Oman Professional League clubs (2016–17)
 Al-Khabourah (Al-Khaburah)
 Al-Nahda (Al-Buraimi)
 Al-Nasr (Salalah)
 Al-Oruba (Sur)
 Al-Rustaq (Al-Rustaq)
 Al-Shabab (Barka)
 Al-Suwaiq (Al-Suwaiq)
 Dhofar (Salalah)
 Fanja (Fanja)
 Ja'lan (Jalan Bani Bu Hassan)
 Muscat (Muscat)
 Oman (Muscat)
 Saham (Saham)
 Sohar (Sohar)

Relegated in 2015-16
 Al-Musannah (Al-Musannah)
 Salalah (Salalah)
 Sur (Sur)

Championship History

Year by year

*The Professional League began from the 2013–14 season

Cities
The following table lists the Oman Professional League champions by cities.

Performance by club

*Includes championships won by Ruwi.

Topscorers

Notable achievements by Omani clubs
The only trophy won by an Omani club in the regional or continental level was by Fanja in the 1989 Persian Gulf Club Champions Cup. Fanja was the first Omani club to win an international tournament. It was the 1989 Gulf Club Champions Cup, later named GCC Champions League. Fanja defeated Al-Muharraq of Bahrain in a penalty shootout after the match had ended 1–1 in the normal time. Fanja has appeared four times in the same tournament.

In the 1993–94 Asian Club Championship Omani club, Oman Club were awarded with second place after failing to beat Thai club, Thai Farmers Bank.

A few years later in 1996, Dhofar attempted to win the GCC Champions Cup, as Fanja did in 1989, but failed in the final match against Saudi club, Al-Nassr and finished with second place.

Most recently Al-Nahda competed in the 2008 AFC Cup, but were knocked-out in the semi-finals by eventual champions of the competition, Al-Muharraq on scoring aggregate.

See also

 Sultan Qaboos Cup
 Oman Professional League Cup
 Oman Super Cup

References

External links

table xscores.com
Kooora Omani League Seasons
Oman Elite League – Hailoosport.com
Oman Professional League summary - Soccerway

 
1
Oman
Sports leagues established in 1976